The Frankfurter Musikpreis has been awarded since 1982 by the joint foundation of the Musikmesse Frankfurt and the National Association of German Musical Instruments Manufacturers. The aim of this international music award is to highlight "personalities from the world of music for special achievements in the fields of interpretation, composition, musicology, teaching and services to music making" (according to its self description). The award is presented annually and alternately to personalities from the world of music in the fields of popular music and classical music. It is endowed with 15,000 euros.

Laureates 

 1982: Gidon Kremer
 1983: Edgar Krapp
 1984: Alfred Brendel
 1985: Brigitte Fassbaender
 1986: Albert Mangelsdorff
 1987: Carl Dahlhaus
 1988: Heinz Holliger
 1989: Ludwig Güttler
 1990: Chick Corea
 1991: Aribert Reimann
 1992: Georg Solti
 1993: Harry Kupfer
 1994: Brian Eno
 1995: Tabea Zimmermann
 1996: Wolfgang Niedecken
 1997: Hans Zender
 1998: Peter Herbolzheimer
 1999: Michael Gielen
 2000: Klaus Doldinger
 2001: Dietrich Fischer-Dieskau
 2002: no award
 2003: Walter Levin
 2004: Udo Lindenberg
 2005: György Ligeti
 2006: Peter Gabriel
 2007: Péter Eötvös
 2008: Paquito D’Rivera
 2009: José Antonio Abreu
 2010: Keith Emerson
 2011: Anne Sofie von Otter
 2012: John McLaughlin
 2013: Marie-Luise Neunecker
 2014: Ernie Watts
 2015: 
 2016: Al Jarreau
 2017: David Garrett
 2018: 
 2019: Quatuor Ébène
 2020: Peter Maffay and his band

References

External links
Frankfurter Musikpreis

German music awards
Music in Frankfurt
Awards established in 1982
1982 establishments in West Germany